The August Holver Hilton House in Socorro, New Mexico was built in 1912.  The house was deemed historically important as the home of August Holver Hilton, father of Conrad Hilton.  The father, born in 1856 in Norway, was successful as a merchant in San Antonio.

It is of Bungalow/Craftsman architecture.  It is also denoted ID#664 and SR Site #631.  The listing included two contributing buildings.

It was listed on the National Register of Historic Places in 1991.

See also

Hilton House (Magdalena, New Mexico), also NRHP-listed in Socorro County
National Register of Historic Places listings in Socorro County, New Mexico

References

Houses on the National Register of Historic Places in New Mexico
Houses completed in 1912
Houses in Socorro County, New Mexico
1912 establishments in New Mexico
National Register of Historic Places in Socorro County, New Mexico